Juan de Arregui (June 24, 1656 – †1736) was a Spanish Franciscan priest native of America and became Roman Catholic Bishop of Buenos Aires in 1730.

de Arrgui was born on 24 June 1656 in Buenos Aires (then in Governorate of the Río de la Plata of the Viceroyalty of Peru), entered the Franciscan order and studied theology at National University of Córdoba.

He died as Bishop of Buenos Aires on 19 December 1736.

Biography

Friar Juan de Arregui was bishop of Buenos Aires (1731) and Paraguay (1735). He exerted political leadership in Paraguay (1733 - 1734) during Revolt of the Comuneros (Paraguay).

References

External links and additional sources
 (for Chronology of Bishops)
 (for Chronology of Bishops)

1656 births
1736 deaths
Spanish Roman Catholic bishops in South America
Spanish Franciscans
Franciscan bishops
People from Buenos Aires
18th-century Roman Catholic bishops in Argentina
Roman Catholic bishops of Buenos Aires